The Observer, previously The Adelaide Observer, was a Saturday newspaper published in Adelaide, South Australia from July 1843 to February 1931. Virtually every issue of the newspaper (under both titles) has been digitised and is available online through the National Library of Australia's Trove archive service.

History

The Adelaide Observer 
The newspaper was founded by John Stephens, its sole proprietor, who in 1845 purchased another local newspaper, the South Australian Register.
It was printed by George Dehane at his establishment on Morphett Street adjacent Trinity Church.

The Observer 
On 7 January 1905, the newspaper was renamed The Observer, whose masthead later proclaimed "The Observer. News of the world, politics, agriculture, mining, literature, sport and society. Established 1843". In February 1931, the ailing Depression-hit newspaper, along with The Register and other sister publications, was taken over by The Advertiser and shut down.

References

External links
 

1843 establishments in Australia
Defunct newspapers published in Adelaide
Newspapers on Trove